Mike Swider (born May 26, 1955) is a former American football coach. He served as head football coach at Wheaton College in Wheaton, Illinois from 1996 to 2019. Swider's Wheaton teams won nine conference titles and made 10 appearances in the NCAA Division III Football Championship. In each of their first five appearances, they were eliminated from the tournament by Larry Kehres's Mount Union Purple Raiders.

Swider's coaching record at Wheaton was 209–52. He had the most wins and highest winning percentage of any coach in program history. Swider announced his retirement on December 10, 2019.

Head coaching record

See also
 List of college football coaches with 200 wins

References

1955 births
Living people
Indiana Hoosiers football coaches
Wheaton Thunder football coaches
High school football coaches in Georgia (U.S. state)